Paradise Run is an American reality competition television program that aired on Nickelodeon from February 1, 2016 to January 26, 2018. The program is presented by Daniella Monet.

Premise 
At the Hilton Waikoloa Village in Hawaii, three teams of two children race around the area competing in three different challenges that are given to them by host Daniella Monet through tablets that are provided for them. The teams are sorted by Team Makani, which is Hawaiian for "wind", Team Nalu, which is Hawaiian for "wave", and Team Ahi, which is Hawaiian for "fire". After following the given directions to complete each challenge, they must grab a souvenir, take a selfie with it on their tablet and send it to Daniella. Once all three challenges are completed, they must solve a riddle to the location of the finish line. The riddle's answer is a suite where Daniella and the parents of the teams are waiting, and the team must race there. The first team to reach the finish line wins a four-day, three-night trip at the hotel while the runners-up receive consolation prizes.

Production 
Paradise Run was picked up by Nickelodeon in December 2015, when it was announced that Daniella Monet would be the host of the program. The program features three teams of children competing against each other in a series of challenges at a Hawaiian resort. It was announced by Nickelodeon that the program would premiere on February 1, 2016. The program is produced by Nickelodeon and Stone Stanley Entertainment, who had previously produced Legends of the Hidden Temple, another Nickelodeon game show in the 1990s. On March 29, 2016, a casting call went out for children on Maui to audition to be contestants on a second season of Paradise Run, for a scheduled filming in May–June 2016. The second season premiered on November 14, 2016. The program was renewed for a third season by Nickelodeon on March 9, 2017. The third season premiered on November 13, 2017.

Episodes

Series overview

Season 1 (2016)

Season 2 (2016–17)

Season 3 (2017–18)

Ratings 
 

| link2             = #Season 2 (2016–17)
| episodes2         = 20
| start2            = 
| end2              = 
| startrating2      = 1.88
| endrating2        = 1.28
| viewers2          = |2}} 

| link3             = #Season 3 (2017–18)
| episodes3         = 30
| start3            = 
| end3              = 
| startrating3      = 1.33
| endrating3        = 1.01
| viewers3          = |2}} 
}}

References

External links 
 

2010s American reality television series
2010s Nickelodeon original programming
2016 American television series debuts
2018 American television series endings
American children's reality television series
English-language television shows
Television shows filmed in Hawaii
Television shows set in Hawaii